Tróndur í Gøtu is a Faroese a fishing trawler and purse seiner. It belongs to the Faroese company Varðin, based in  Syðrugøta. Tróndur í Gøtu is active in the pelagic fishing industry and fishes mainly mackerel, herring, capelin and blue whiting in the sea around the Faroe Islands and elsewhere, depending on where the Faroe Islands gets fishing quotas. The ship was built in 2010 on Karstensens Skibsværft A/S in Skagen, Denmark. Tróndur í Gøtu lands most of its catches to the pelagic fish factory Varðin Pelagic in Tvøroyri and to Havsbrún in Fuglafjørður.

References 

Ships built in Denmark
2010 ships
Trawlers
Ships of the Faroe Islands